Schweich is a town in the Trier-Saarburg district, in Rhineland-Palatinate, Germany. It is situated on the river Moselle, approx.  northeast of Trier.

Schweich is the seat of the Verbandsgemeinde ("collective municipality") Schweich an der Römischen Weinstraße.

Twin towns — sister cities
Schweich is twinned with:

  Marsannay-la-Côte, France  
  Portishead, Somerset, United Kingdom 
  Krokowa, Poland
  Renesse, Netherlands
  Murialdo, Italy

Personalities 

 Stefan Andres (1906–1970), writer, see also Stefan Andres Society, Stefan Andres Prize
 Gabriele Pauli (born 1957), former politician 
 Katarina Barley (born 1968), politician (SPD)

References

External links 

Trier-Saarburg